Joseph B. "Prince" Musch (12 October 1893 – 25 September 1971) was a Belgian football (soccer) player who competed in the 1920 Summer Olympics. He was a member of the Belgium team, which won the gold medal in the football tournament. Joseph played for R.U. Saint-Gilloise and appeared in 258 matches scoring 113 goals.

References

External links
profile

1893 births
1971 deaths
Belgian footballers
Footballers at the 1920 Summer Olympics
Footballers at the 1924 Summer Olympics
Olympic footballers of Belgium
Olympic gold medalists for Belgium
Belgium international footballers
Olympic medalists in football
Medalists at the 1920 Summer Olympics
Association football defenders